Apple River is a village in Jo Daviess County, Illinois, United States. The population was 366 at the 2010 census, down from 379 in 2000.

Geography

Apple River is located at  (42.502998, -90.097209).

Demographics

As of the census of 2000, there were 379 people, 159 households, and 102 families residing in the village. The racial makeup of the village was 98.94% White, 0.79% African American, and 0.26% from two or more races.

There were 159 households, out of which 30.8% had children under the age of 18 living with them, 50.9% were married couples living together, 9.4% had a female householder with no husband present, and 35.8% were non-families. 32.1% of all households were made up of individuals, and 16.4% had someone living alone who was 65 years of age or older.  The average household size was 2.38 and the average family size was 2.93.

In the village, the population was spread out, with 27.7% under the age of 18, 5.3% from 18 to 24, 30.3% from 25 to 44, 19.5% from 45 to 64, and 17.2% who were 65 years of age or older.  The median age was 38 years. For every 100 females, there were 98.4 males.  For every 100 females age 18 and over, there were 94.3 males.

The median income for a household in the village was $40,250, and the median income for a family was $51,042. Males had a median income of $35,893 versus $21,103 for females. The per capita income for the village was $18,267.  About 8.8% of families and 10.2% of the population were below the poverty line, including 8.0% of those under age 18 and 13.3% of those age 65 or over.

See also
Apple River Canyon State Park
Millville, Illinois

References

External links
Jo Daviess County

Villages in Jo Daviess County, Illinois
Villages in Illinois